Cheongwon-gu is a non-autonomous district in the city of Cheongju in North Chungcheong Province, South Korea. Cheongwon-gu was established from a part of Sangdang-gu and a part of Cheongwon-gun in July 2014.

Administrative divisions 
Cheongwon-gu is divided into 2 towns (eup), one township (myeon), and 5 neighbourhoods (dong).

References

External links 
 

 
Districts of Cheongju
2014 establishments in South Korea
States and territories established in 2014